is a Japanese politician who served as the Minister for Internal Affairs and Communications from August until November 2022. A member of the Liberal Democratic Party, he also serves in the House of Representatives and was Special Advisor to Prime Minister Fumio Kishida from December 2021 to August 2022. 

A native of Hiroshima, Hiroshima and graduate of the University of Tokyo (Alma mater, Faculty of Law), Terada joined the Ministry of Finance in 1980, attending Harvard University in United States while in the ministry, in 1982.

Terada's wife Keiko is a granddaughter of Hayato Ikeda, former Prime minister of Japan. He was elected for the first time in 2004, when he left the ministry after the death of his uncle and former Foreign Minister Yukihiko Ikeda. 

Terada also served as Secretary at the Embassy of Japan in Washington, D.C., Senior Vice Minister of Cabinet Office, and Senior Vice Minister for Reconstruction

Affiliated to the openly revisionist lobby Nippon Kaigi, which advocates a return to militarism in Japan, Terada is in favor of allowing collective self-defense.

On November 20, 2022, Terada was sacked from his position as the Minister for Internal Affairs and Communications after a magazine alleging him of misusing political funds, prompting calls for his resignation from opposition parties who saw him as unfit to supervise election-related laws.

References

External links 
  Official website

1958 births
Living people
21st-century Japanese politicians
Harvard University alumni
Liberal Democratic Party (Japan) politicians
Members of the House of Representatives (Japan)
Members of Nippon Kaigi
Ministers of Internal Affairs of Japan
Politicians from Hiroshima Prefecture
University of Tokyo alumni